The Girard School District is a public school district serving parts of Erie County, Pennsylvania. It encompasses the communities of Girard, Girard Township, and Lake City. It contains three schools: Elk Valley Elementary School, Rice Avenue Middle School, and Girard High School.

Notable alumni 
Marc Blucas - Actor, Buffy the Vampire Slayer and more. Girard High School class of 1990

External links
Girard School District website

School districts in Erie County, Pennsylvania